2005 Desafio Internacional das Estrelas was the first edition of Desafio Internacional das Estrelas (International Challenge of the Stars) kart race, held in 2005 in Brazil, was won by Daniel Serra.

Race 1 results
1 – Daniel Serra, 25 points
2 – Allam Khodair, 20

Race 2 results
1 – Allam Khodair,
3 – Daniel Serra,

Final classification

References

2005
Desafio